Ish-bosheth ("man of shame"), also called Eshbaal (alternatively spelled Ishbaal, "fire of Baal") was, according to the Hebrew Bible, the second monarch of the Kingdom of Israel who succeeded his father, Saul. He reigned for two years, during which he was at war with David. He was killed by two of his own army captains.

Biblical narrative
In the biblical account, Abner, the captain of Saul's army, proclaimed Ish-bosheth king over Israel at Mahanaim in  Transjordan, after the slaying of Ish-bosheth's father and brothers in the battle of Gilboa. Ish-bosheth was 40 years old at this time and reigned for two years. 

However, after the death of King Saul, the tribe of Judah seceded from the rule of the House of Saul by proclaiming David as its king, and war ensued. David's faction eventually prevailed against Ish-bosheth's, but the war continued until Abner joined David. 

Before the death of Saul, David had been married to Saul's daughter Michal, Ish-bosheth's sister, until Saul and David had a falling out and Saul gave her to another man. Later, at the conclusion of the war with Ish-bosheth, David's terms for peace required returning Michal to him, and Ish-bosheth complied. After Abner's death, Ish-bosheth seems to have given up hope of retaining power.

Two of Ish-bosheth's own army-captains, Rechab and Baanah, assassinated the deposed king, expecting a reward from David for this. David, however, refused to give any commendation for high treason; he had both killers executed and their hands and feet cut off. David's supporters buried the head of Ish-bosheth in Abner's grave at Hebron.

Problem of naming

The names Ish-bosheth and Eshbaal have ambiguous meanings in the original Hebrew. In Hebrew, Ish-bosheth means "Man of shame". He is also called Eshbaal, in Hebrew meaning "Baal exists", or "fire of Baal".

Critical scholarship suggests that Bosheth was a substitute for Baʿal, beginning when Baʿal became an unspeakable word; as (in the opposite direction) Adonai became substituted for the ineffable Tetragrammaton (see taboo deformation).

As Ish-bosheth
He is exclusively called Ish-bosheth in the Books of Samuel in the Hebrew Bible:
Now Abner the son of Ner, captain of Saul's host, had taken Ish-bosheth the son of Saul, and brought him over to Mahanaim; and he made him king over Gilead, and over the Ashurites, and over Jezreel, and over Ephraim, and over Benjamin, and over all Israel. Ish-bosheth Saul's son was forty years old when he began to reign over Israel, and he reigned two years. (Jewish Publication Society, 1917)

When he was assassinated and King David punished the killers:
... Rechab and Baanah, went, and came about the heat of the day to the house of Ish-bosheth, as he took his rest at noon, and they came into the house, as though they would have fetched wheat; and they struck him in the groin; and Rechab and Baanah his brother escaped. ... And they brought the head of Ish-bosheth to David in Hebron, and said to the king: "Behold the head of Ish-bosheth the son of Saul your enemy, who sought your life; and the Lord has avenged my lord the king this day of Saul, and of his seed." ... And David answered ... "shall I not now require his blood of your hand, and take you away from the earth?" ... But they took the head of Ish-bosheth, and buried it in the grave of Abner in Hebron.

As Eshbaal
Meanwhile, in the Books of Chronicles, he is exclusively called Eshbaal:

And Ner begot Kish; and Kish begot Saul; and Saul begot Jonathan, and Malchi-shua, and Abinadab, and Eshbaal.

Archaeology
In 2012, according to the Israel Antiquities Authority, archaeologists had discovered a 3,000-year-old inscription on a reconstructed large ceramic jar found in Khirbet Qeiyafa, containing the name "Eshbaal ben Beda". Though this Eshbaal is a different person than the Eshbaal/Ish-bosheth of the Bible, it was the first time the name was discovered in an ancient inscription. It is one of only four Hebrew inscriptions ever discovered dating to the 10th century BC.

References

Bibliography

External links
Ish-bosheth (Article by: Emil G. Hirsch and M. Seligsohn in Jewish Encyclopedia)
King Ishbosheth - Biography (Christian view)
Easton's Bible Dictionary (Ish-bosheth)
"Eshbaʽal Ben Bedaʽ" pottery inscription discovery, from the Time of King David

1050s BC births
1010s BC deaths
11th-century BC Kings of Israel (united monarchy)
Kings of ancient Israel
Ancient murdered monarchs
11th-century BCE Hebrew people
Biblical murder victims
11th-century BC murdered monarchs
Dethroned monarchs
Male murder victims
House of Saul